Louis Béguet (7 December 1894 – 2 March 1983) was a French rugby union player who competed in the 1924 Summer Olympics. He was born in Neuf-Mesnil, Nord and died in Nantes. In 1924 he won the silver medal as member of the French team.

References

External links
Louis Béguet's pro file at databaseOlympics
profile 
Louis Béguet's profile at Sports Reference.com

1894 births
1983 deaths
French rugby union players
Olympic rugby union players of France
Rugby union players at the 1924 Summer Olympics
Olympic silver medalists for France
France international rugby union players
Medalists at the 1924 Summer Olympics